Brian Wright (born 1943) is a male former international table tennis player from England.

Table tennis career
He represented England at two World Table Tennis Championships in the Swaythling Cup (men's team event) from 1965 to 1969.

He won two English National Table Tennis Championships mixed doubles titles.

Personal life
On 4 September 1965, he married fellow table tennis international Mary Shannon, his frequent partner in mixed doubles competitions. They had at least three children.

See also
 List of England players at the World Team Table Tennis Championships

References

English male table tennis players
1943 births
Living people
Place of birth missing (living people)